A secondary city often follows after a primate city and can be seen in the urban hierarchy.
Secondary cities often have between “500,000 to 3 million inhabitants, but are frequently unknown outside of their national or regional context. Many secondary cities in the Global South are expected to undergo massive expansions in the next few decades, comparable to city growth in Europe and North America over the past two centuries.

"A secondary city is largely determined by population, size, function, and economic status. Commonly, secondary cities are geographically defined urban jurisdictions or centres performing vital governance, logistical, and production functions at a sub-national or sub-metropolitan region level within a system of cities in a country. In some cases, their role and functions may expand to a geographic region of the global realm. The population of secondary-cities range between 10 and 50% of a country's largest city, although some can be smaller than this. They will likely constitute a sub-national or sub-metropolitan second-tier level of government, acting as centres for public administration and delivery of education, knowledge, health, community, and security services; an industrial centre or development growth pole; a new national capital; or a large city making up a cluster of smaller cities in a large metropolitan region."

Furthermore, secondary cities “usually form more recent poles of growth, often also with a more diffuse genealogy, than larger metropoles. The ambivalent situation of these towns (in the periphery of the centre and in the centre of the periphery, in so far as these notions still retain their meaning) generates a particular, and by definition highly hybrid, socio-cultural urban dynamic which in turn influences the outlook of social, political and economic life in the more visible national metropoles.”

Secondary cities have their own socio-economic and political culture that may differ from other cities such as Primate cites. Moreover, in the secondary city (and more generally in the margin of the state) there often is more room for improvisation. Local commerce, trading routes and smuggling networks determine the economic sphere in important ways; local forms of associational life (the middle ground of ‘civil society’) has a far greater influence on local politics than is the case in larger urban centres, and the functioning of local, decentralized political authorities is often shaped and cross-cut to a far greater extent by constantly shifting alliances between local stakeholders.”

Significance
According to UN-HABITAT, "slum population now expands annually by 25 million. In 1950 there were 86 cities in the world with a population over one million, today there are 400, and by 2015, there will be at least 550."

Moreover, cities have absorbed nearly two-thirds of the global population explosion since 1950 and are currently growing by a million babies and migrants each week.

Consequently, countries like India are developing secondary cities to absorb informal dwellers—as India's chief economic planner, Montek singh Ahluwalia in 2007, observes: "One hundred million people are moving to cities in the next 10 years, and it’s important that these 100 million are absorbed into second-tier cities instead of showing up in Delhi or Mumbai." In Latin America, where primary cities long monopolized growth, secondary cities like Tijuana, Curitiba, Temuco, Salvador and Belém are now booming, "with the fastest growth of all occurring cities with between 100,000 and 500,000 inhabitants."

Furthermore, China "may still be under the radar for many westerners but China's second and third-level cities will rise in profile over the next few years." New city developments by governments and other organizations are now focusing on secondary cities. Sociologist Saskia Sassen suggests that “small cities can be a global platform for companies' global expansion.”

Also in China, "[t]he world's top hotel companies are clambering to open properties in China's second- and third-tier cities across all their brands. The sheer size of even tertiary cities, coupled with the growth in domestic travel and the potential gains of modern, international meeting facilities, has led to hotel development at unprecedented levels." These new developments are trying to integrate secondary cities into the global and local economy as well from the examples that are seen from China. Another sign of development is that China Eastern Airlines has increased its number of flights to secondary cities in China.

Importance 
According to the World Bank, secondary Cities make up almost 40% of the world cities population. Nearly two-thirds of these are located in Africa and Asia: "They form an important part of an emerging global system of cities." While the large cities play a significant role in shaping the new economic geography of cities in fostering global trade, travel and investment, it is secondary cities which will have a much stronger influence in the future upon the economic development of countries."

While the importance of secondary cities is increasingly recognised, growing inequalities are emerging between systems of cities and regions, with metropolitan areas often prospering at the expense of smaller cities and rural areas. Small and medium-sized (or intermediary) generate little more than 15 per cent of global GDP. 

Moreover, many secondary cities have a high and expensive dependency on them for access to markets, goods, supply chains, transport, and advanced business and community services. Secondary cities often have low levels of lateral connectivity and trade between transportation corridors – making it hard to attract investments, jobs, or add value to exports due to economies of scale and high transaction costs. Networks are critical to improving the level of communications, exchange and movement among systems of secondary cities. 

Many networks will require investment in hard infrastructure, such as transport and communications, and soft infrastructure to facilitate greater economic, social, cultural and governance exchange. This involves building city, industry and firm partnerships, as well as collaborative governance and economic development. Collaboration is also vital to finance such hard and soft strategic infrastructure, through arrangements to share revenue as well as development, operating and maintenance costs.

If enhanced connectivity is to be used as a strategy to support the economic development of secondary cities, policy makers must understand the need for integration of hard and soft connectivity elements, and how governments can facilitate their development.

Categories
Secondary cities fall into three categories or typologies:

 Sub-national cities being centres of local government, industry, agriculture, tourism and mining; 
 City cluster development associated with expanded, satellite and new town cities which surround large urban metropolitan regions, and; 
 Economic trade corridors which are urban growth centre or poles planned or developing along major transport corridors.

"While the industrial revolution and 20th century national self-sufficiency industrialization policies, were to have a profound impact in shaping the development of countries, the current thrust of globalization is changing the dynamics and development of cities, especially developing cities, in ways few would have envisaged half a century ago. There is now growing levels of functional specialization and linkages occurring within the system of secondary cities. The new economic geography has increased competition in small, medium sized cities from international producers and markets. Growing specialization of production systems, supply chains, SMART logistics and inter-modal transfer systems, and the externalization of decision making by expanded consultation, decision-making and investment decisions well outside local government jurisdictions." If the efficiency of secondary cities were to improve this could double or triple the GDP of many poor cities and rural regions. In the countries where there is a less distorted system of secondary cities, countries that are not dominated by one mega city, there is generally lower levels of regional development disparities, higher levels of national productivity and income per capita"

References

Further reading 
Markusen, Ann R., Yong-Sook Lee, and Sean DiGiovanna. Second Tier Cities: Rapid Growth beyond the Metropolis. Minneapolis: University of Minnesota, 1999. Print.
 Davis, Mike. Planet of Slums. London: Verso, 2006. Print.

Urban planning
Cities by type